Ricardo da Silveira Lobo Sternberg (born 1948) is a Canadian poet.

Born in Rio de Janeiro, Brazil, Sternberg moved to the United States with his family when he was fifteen. He received a B.A. in English literature from the University of California, Riverside and an M.A. and Ph.D. in Comparative Literature from UCLA. Between 1975 and 1978, he was a Junior Fellow with the Society of Fellows at Harvard University. His poetry has been published in magazines such as The Paris Review, The Nation, Poetry (Chicago), Descant, American Poetry Review, The Virginia Quarterly Review and Ploughshares., He has lived in Toronto, Canada since 1979 teaching Brazilian and Portuguese Literature at the University of Toronto.

He is the author of four books. Blindsight, a CD of his readings, was released in 1998 by Cyclops Press.

Bibliography
The Invention of Honey. Montreal: Véhicule, 1990.
Map of Dreams. Montreal: Véhicule, 1996.
Bamboo Church. Montreal: McGill-Queen's University Press, 1996.
Some Dance. Montreal: McGill-Queen's University Press, 2014.

Discography
Blindsight. Toronto: Cyclops, 1998.

References

External links
Ricardo Sternberg's website
Ricardo da Silveira Lobo Sternberg archival papers held at the University of Toronto Archives and Records Management Services
 Review of The Invention of Honey
 Review of The Invention of Honey
 Review of Map of Dreams
 Review of Bamboo Church
 Review of Bamboo Church
 Review of Bamboo Church
 Review of Bamboo Church
 Review of Bamboo Church
 Review of Bamboo Church
 Review of Some Dance

1948 births
Brazilian emigrants to the United States
Brazilian male writers
American emigrants to Canada
University of California, Riverside alumni
University of California, Los Angeles alumni
Harvard Fellows
20th-century Canadian poets
Canadian male poets
Living people
Writers from Rio de Janeiro (city)
Writers from Toronto
Berkeley High School (Berkeley, California) alumni
20th-century Canadian male writers